Southern Railway Passenger Depot is a historic train station located at Biltmore Village, Asheville, Buncombe County, North Carolina. It was designed by architect Richard Morris Hunt and built in 1896 for the Southern Railway.

The station replaced a smaller building that preceded Cornelius Vanderbilt's purchase of land to comprise the Biltmore Estate. 

In 1968 following the demolition of the Asheville train station, the Biltmore station served as Asheville's station until passenger train service was discontinued in 1975.  The station now houses a restaurant. If passenger service to Asheville is restored, a new station will be built. 

The station was listed on the National Register of Historic Places in 1979.

References

Railway stations on the National Register of Historic Places in North Carolina
Railway stations in the United States opened in 1896
Buildings and structures in Asheville, North Carolina
National Register of Historic Places in Buncombe County, North Carolina
Asheville
Former railway stations in North Carolina